Laura Suarez or Suárez may refer to:

Laura Suarez (singer) (1909–1990), Brazilian singer
Laura Suárez (footballer) (born 1992), Puerto Rican women's international footballer
Laura Margarita Suárez (born 1953), Mexican politician
Laura Suárez (volleyball), Cuban volleyball player